Tinazzi is a surname. It may refer to:

Fabio Tinazzi (born 1983), Italian football player
Giorgio Tinazzi (1934–2016), Italian football player
Marcel Tinazzi (born 1953), French road bicycle racer of Italian parents
Pierlucio Tinazzi (1962–1999), Italian security guard who perished while rescuing survivors of the 1999 Mont Blanc tunnel